Condica subornata is a moth of the family Noctuidae. It is found in Jamaica, Central and South America. It has also been reported from Texas, but this is a misidentification.

References

Moths described in 1865
Condicinae